Hydroeciodes is a genus of moths of the family Noctuidae.

Species
 Hydroeciodes alala (Druce, 1890)
 Hydroeciodes alternata Dyar, 1926
 Hydroeciodes anastagia Dyar, 1910
 Hydroeciodes aspasta Dyar, 1918
 Hydroeciodes auripurpura (Blanchard, 1968)
 Hydroeciodes azteca (Schaus, 1894)
 Hydroeciodes catadea Dyar, 1921
 Hydroeciodes cauta (Schaus, 1903)
 Hydroeciodes cetebu Dyar, 1923
 Hydroeciodes cirramela Dyar, 1916
 Hydroeciodes compressipuncta Dyar, [1920]
 Hydroeciodes compulsa Draudt, 1924
 Hydroeciodes danastia Dyar, 1910
 Hydroeciodes exagitans Dyar, [1920]
 Hydroeciodes felova Dyar, 1910
 Hydroeciodes impica Dyar, 1918
 Hydroeciodes juvenilis (Grote, 1881)
 Hydroeciodes lepida Draudt, 1924
 Hydroeciodes leucogramma Hampson, 1905
 Hydroeciodes leucopis Hampson, 1905
 Hydroeciodes marcona Schaus, 1921
 Hydroeciodes mendicosa Dyar, 1910
 Hydroeciodes mormon Dyar, 1918
 Hydroeciodes muelleri Draudt, 1924
 Hydroeciodes multesima Draudt, 1924
 Hydroeciodes ochrimacula (Barnes & McDunnough, 1913)
 Hydroeciodes parafea Dyar, 1921
 Hydroeciodes pericopis Dyar, [1927]
 Hydroeciodes pexa (Schaus, 1903)
 Hydroeciodes pexinella Dyar, 1916
 Hydroeciodes piacularis Draudt, 1924
 Hydroeciodes plugmona Dyar, [1927]
 Hydroeciodes pothen Dyar, 1918
 Hydroeciodes pyrastis Dognin, 1907
 Hydroeciodes rectilinea Dyar, 1914
 Hydroeciodes repleta (Bird, 1911)
 Hydroeciodes ritaria Schaus, 1921
 Hydroeciodes ruxis Dyar, 1916
 Hydroeciodes serrata (Grote, 1880)
 Hydroeciodes tintebela Dyar, 1923
 Hydroeciodes traversa Dyar, 1918
 Hydroeciodes xanthina Hampson, 1905
 Hydroeciodes zinda Dyar, 1910

References
 Hydroeciodes at funet.fi
 Natural History Museum Lepidoptera genus database

Hadeninae